For other uses related to Sidhhanath Temple, see: Sidhhanath Temple (disambiguation)

Revansiddha Temple is a holistic devine temple dedicated to Lord Sri dev Revansiddha, (Renukacharya-the first panchacharya). It was built in the' 16th century and lies hardly three furlongs away from the village Renavi.

Renavi is celebrated for an old temple dedicated to Revan Nath( Revan Siddh), a saint of repute, said to have been under the special favour of Lord Sri. Dattatreya and lil a great favourite of the Lingayats, because Lord Sri dev Revansiddhanath met Sri Siddheshwar Maharaj, main Saint of Lingayat at Gurubhet in Sholapur city & gave Diksha.

History
The temple is a conspicuous object on the south side of the Chiplun-Karad-Bijapur road as soon as the plateau is reached. To the east of this sacred shrine is Urul Siddh and to the west in a tunnel is Visvaradya. The story runs that the Revan mountain was formerly composed of five metals. White crystals are found in abundance on the mountain and these are used as bhasma by the devotees. Besides, soils of various colours are also found. As many as 84 tirhas or holy centres were believed to have been situated on this sacred mountain but all except six have disappeared. Those now in existence are a gomukh, two haranyak and three flower gardens.

Fair
A yearly fair is held on the day of Mahashivaratri which attracts thousands of devotes from places like Sangli, Solapur and Karnatak. A majority of the disciples of this saint are spread over Maharashtra and Karnataka.

Shaivism
Hindu temples in Maharashtra